Gtech may refer to:

  GTECH S.p.A., now International Game Technology, formerly Lottomatica S.p.A.
 GTECH Corporation, an American company that was acquired by Lottomatica in 2006
 Grey Technology (Gtech), a British company Grey Technology Ltd (Gtech) for cordless home and garden appliances